Her Excellency, the Governor is a 1917 American silent drama film produced and distributed by the Triangle Film Corporation. Directed by Albert Parker, the film stars Elda Milar, who later became well known as gossip columnist Hedda Hopper. The film is loosely based the play His Excellency, the Governor, by Robert Marshall.

Cast
 Wilfred Lucas - James Barclay
 Hedda Hopper as Sylvia Marlowe (credited as Elda Milar)
 Joseph Kilgour- Joe Keller
 Regan Hughston- Governor's Secretary
 Walter Walker - Capitalist
 Edith Speare - Lieutenant Governor
 Albert Perry - Reform Senator

Reception
Like many American films of the time, Her Excellency, the Governor was subject to cuts by city and state film censorship boards. The Chicago Board of Censors required the cutting of an intertitle that stated, "You're around her quite often - why don't you compromise her?"

References

External links
 
 

1917 films
1917 drama films
Silent American drama films
American silent feature films
American black-and-white films
American films based on plays
Films directed by Albert Parker
Triangle Film Corporation films
1910s American films